Houthem-Sint Gerlach railway station is located in Houthem, the Netherlands.

Train services
Houthem-Sint Gerlach station is served by Arriva with the following train services:
Local stoptrein S4: Maastricht–Heerlen

References

External links
NS website 

Railway stations on the Heuvellandlijn
Railway stations opened in 1890
Railway stations in Valkenburg aan de Geul